Jawbat Burghal is a town in northwestern Syria, administratively part of the Latakia Governorate, located east of Latakia in an-Nusayriyah Mountains. Nearby localities include Qardaha, al-Fakhurah, Istamo and Shatha. According to the Syria Central Bureau of Statistics, Jawbat Burghal had a population of 959 in the 2004 census. Its inhabitants are predominantly Alawites.

The village was the birthplace and base of the controversial Syrian religious leader, Sulayman al-Murshid. Al-Murshid was encouraged by the French mandate authorities to establish a new sect, and made Jawbat Burghal his base where he became a proponent of Alawite independence. He acquired livestock from his followers and built a western villa in the town. After Syria's independence, however, the central Syrian government in Damascus cracked down on separatist movements including Murshid's. He surrendered to the authorities after a short confrontation with Syrian Army units at his headquarters. Sulayman al-Murshid was executed in a public square in Damascus for treason in November 1946.

References

Populated places in Qardaha District
Towns in Syria
Alawite communities in Syria